Ruslan Albertovich Galiakberov (born 20 November 1989) is a Russian professional football player.

Club career
He made his Russian Football National League debut for FC Neftekhimik Nizhnekamsk on 1 April 2013 in a game against FC Khimki.

On 8 July 2015, Galiakberov joined Kazakhstan Premier League side FC Zhetysu on loan.

References

External links
 

1989 births
Footballers from Kazan
Living people
Russian footballers
Association football forwards
FC Rubin Kazan players
FC Zhetysu players
FC KAMAZ Naberezhnye Chelny players
FC Neftekhimik Nizhnekamsk players
Russian Second League players
Russian First League players
Kazakhstan Premier League players
Russian expatriate footballers
Expatriate footballers in Kazakhstan
Russian expatriate sportspeople in Kazakhstan